William Thomas Hader Jr. (born June 7, 1978) is an American actor, comedian, writer, producer, and director. Hader first gained widespread attention for his eight-year stint as a cast member on the long-running NBC sketch comedy series Saturday Night Live from 2005 to 2013, for which he received four Primetime Emmy Award nominations and a Peabody Award. He became known for his impressions and especially for his work on the Weekend Update segments, in which he played Stefon Meyers, a flamboyant New York tour guide who recommends unusual nightclubs and parties with bizarre characters with unusual tastes.

Hader is currently the creator, producer, writer, director, and star of the HBO dark comedy series Barry (2018–2023), for which he has been nominated for eight Emmy Awards, winning two. He is also the star and producer of the IFC mockumentary comedy series Documentary Now! (2015–present) which he co-created along with Fred Armisen and Seth Meyers.

Hader has had supporting roles in the films You, Me and Dupree (2006), Hot Rod (2007), Superbad (2007), Forgetting Sarah Marshall (2008), Night at the Museum: Battle of the Smithsonian, (2009), Paul (2011), This Is 40 (2012), and 22 Jump Street (2014), as well as leading roles in The Skeleton Twins (2014), Trainwreck (2015), and as an adult Richie Tozier in It Chapter Two (2019).

He also is known for his extensive work in voice-over, portraying both leading and supporting characters in films such as the Cloudy with a Chance of Meatballs franchise (2009–2013), Turbo (2013), Inside Out (2015), The BFG (2016), Power Rangers (2017), Toy Story 4 (2019) and Lightyear (2022).

Early life
Hader was born in Tulsa, Oklahoma, on June 7, 1978, the son of dance teacher Sherri Renee (née Patton) (b. 1956) and air cargo company owner, restaurant manager, truck driver, and occasional stand-up comedian William Thomas Hader Sr (b. 1953). He has two younger sisters named Katie and Kara. His ancestry includes Danish, English, German, and Irish. Hader attended Patrick Henry Elementary School, Edison Junior High, and Cascia Hall Preparatory School. He grew up with writer Duffy Boudreau, with whom he would later collaborate. He says he "had a hard time focusing in class" and "was always joking around". With a feeling of not fitting in, he filled his time watching movies and reading. He appreciated Monty Python, British comedy, and the films of Woody Allen and Mel Brooks, originally being shown many of these by his father. He made short films with friends and starred in a school production of The Glass Menagerie. He was unable to gain admission to top film schools because of his "abysmal" grades, so he instead enrolled at The Art Institute of Phoenix, and later Scottsdale Community College. His first job was as a Christmas tree salesman. He also worked as an usher at a Tempe cinema, which allowed him to see films for free, but he was fired for spoiling the ending of Titanic (1997) for unruly viewers. At Scottsdale Community College, he met Nicholas Jasenovec, who later directed Paper Heart (2009).

Career

1999–2004: Early career
Hader's aspirations of becoming a filmmaker eventually led him to drop out of college and move to Los Angeles in 1999. His parents were supportive of his decision and allowed him to use the money they had saved up for his education to cover his living expenses in Los Angeles. He found work as a production assistant (PA) while scouring the back pages of The Hollywood Reporter, and hoped to advance far enough to become an assistant director. He spent much of his life as a young man "lonely and underemployed" and filled large amounts of his time by watching movies. He regularly worked 18-hour days as a PA, having little time to pursue his creative ambitions. He worked as a PA on the documentary Empire of Dreams: The Story of the Star Wars Trilogy (2004) and the feature films James Dean (2001), Spider-Man (2002), and Collateral Damage (2002). He also worked as a post-production assistant on the VH1 reality show The Surreal Life (2003–2006). He briefly worked as a PA and stage manager on Playboy TV's sexual fantasy show Night Calls, but soon quit as he feared it would disappoint his parents. He eventually quit being a PA altogether after a bad experience while shooting The Scorpion King (2002).

Hader subsequently secured a job working as a night-time assistant editor at the post-production facility Triage Entertainment. He invested money into his own short film, but was too embarrassed to release it. Shortly thereafter, he and his then-longtime girlfriend broke up. Desperate for a change, he began attending comedy classes with friends at improvisational comedy enterprise the Second City in March 2003. He quickly realized that comedy was the creative outlet that he had needed since he decided to leave higher education behind, and soon Hader, his new compatriot in comedy Matt Offerman, and their two friends and fellow humor enthusiasts Eric Filipkowski and Mel Cowan, elected to form their own sketch comedy group. Christening their group Animals from the Future, the four frequently appeared to small audiences at backyard shows in Van Nuys. Matt's brother, actor Nick Offerman, told his wife, Megan Mullally, about the group. After attending one of the group's backyard appearances, Mullally told Hader of her intention to discuss him with Lorne Michaels of Saturday Night Live (SNL). As a result of Mullally's recommendation, Hader was asked to audition for the show and he soon flew to New York to audition for a group of SNL producers. Hader had no impressions prepared when he was invited to audition. He was nervous and struggled to display his strengths during the audition. This resulted in his spontaneous imitation of an Italian man he had once overheard. The impression would later become the first of Hader's many recurring characters on the show: Vinny Vedecci. As a result of the audition, Hader got an agent and manager. Just before he was officially invited to begin work on SNL, Hader was working as an assistant editor on Iron Chef America.

2005–2013: Breakthrough and Saturday Night Live
Hader was hired as a featured player and made his debut on the show on October 1, 2005. His first role was as a psychologist giving his views about life and death during the emergency landing of JetBlue Airways Flight 292. He felt he had gone from "preschool to Harvard." He became the "impressions guy", hoping to fill a utility-player role "like his hero Phil Hartman". Hader has said that he performed impersonations of teachers and friends when he was growing up but did not do impersonations of famous people until his Saturday Night Live audition. His list of impressions includes Vincent Price in the Variety Vault sketches, Keith Morrison, Harvey Fierstein, Al Pacino, Rick Perry, John Malkovich, James Carville, Julian Assange, Eliot Spitzer, Alan Alda, Clint Eastwood, and Charlie Sheen. On July 19, 2012, Hader received his first nomination for a Primetime Emmy Award for Outstanding Supporting Actor in a Comedy Series for his work on SNL. He is the first male SNL cast member to receive this nomination since Eddie Murphy in 1984.

Among the characters Hader played was Stefon, Weekend Updates flamboyant New York City correspondent, whose recommendations consist solely of bizarre nightclubs involving nightmarish characters. Stefon is in love with and married to Seth Meyers. He was originally a one-shot character on a season-34 sketch where a screenwriter named David Zolesky (played by Ben Affleck) invites his estranged brother Stefon over to pitch a family-friendly sports drama about a college student who bonds with his grandfather so he can try out for the college football team. He is based on two people SNL writer John Mulaney and Hader met: a wannabe club owner who always invited Mulaney to weird underground clubs and a barista Hader met who looks, speaks, and dresses like Stefon.

After his film debut You, Me and Dupree (2006), Hader had a wide range of roles in 2007, such as Katherine Heigl's character's editor at E! in Knocked Up, the acid-taking mechanic Dave in Hot Rod alongside SNL castmate Andy Samberg, a recumbent biker in The Brothers Solomon (which featured SNL castmate Will Forte in one of the film's co-leading roles) and, most famously, as Officer Slater in the Judd Apatow produced Superbad. His role in Superbad helped boost his public awareness and allowed him to appear on mainstream programs like Total Request Live, The Tonight Show, and MTV's Video Music Awards.

Hader worked as a creative consultant, producer, and voice actor on South Park, beginning in the series' 12th season. His involvement in the series stems from his friendship with Matt Stone; the two held a similar sense of humor and Hader began going on writers' retreats with the staff. He began working on the program hoping to learn story structure. Hader is among the series producers to win the 2009 Emmy Award for Best Animated Series. He also appeared on the commentary recorded for the 2009 Blu-ray edition of South Park: Bigger, Longer and Uncut, and the Comedy Central special 6 Days to Air, a documentary filmed during production of the 2011 South Park episode "HumancentiPad". Hader rejoined the writing staff for South Park for its 17th season. Hader won a 2008 Peabody Award in Political Satire for his participation in Saturday Night Live. He also appeared on the MTV prank series Punk'd and voiced an array of characters on the second season of the Adult Swim animated series Xavier: Renegade Angel. He also made several short films, including Back in the Day, Sounds Good to Me: Remastering the Sting, and The Jeannie Tate Show, with SNL writer Liz Cackowski and then-wife Maggie Carey.

In 2008, Hader starred in, and cowrote with Simon Rich, the web series The Line on Crackle. Hader lent his voice to the audiobook of Sarah Vowell's The Wordy Shipmates. Also in 2008, Hader appeared on Tim and Eric Awesome Show impersonating the recurring character James Quall on the episode "Jazz". He appeared in two other Apatow projects: Forgetting Sarah Marshall  and Pineapple Express. He also starred alongside Ben Stiller, Robert Downey, Jr. and Tom Cruise in the action comedy Tropic Thunder. Hader re-teamed with Superbad director Greg Mottola in the comedy films Adventureland (2009) and Paul (2011). He lent his voice to his first video game role in Grand Theft Auto IV, which also featured his SNL castmates Jason Sudeikis and Fred Armisen.

Hader and SNL castmate Seth Meyers penned a Spider-Man one-off entitled The Short Halloween. It was illustrated by Kevin Maguire and came out May 29, 2009. It was given three and a half out of five stars by Benjamin Birdie of Comic Book Resources. He made a small appearance in the 2009 comedy film Year One, with Jack Black and Michael Cera. Hader lent his voice to the Sony Pictures Animation film Cloudy with a Chance of Meatballs, as well as its 2013 sequel, playing the lead role of Flint Lockwood as well as his invention in the films, the FLDSMDFR. He voiced a gazelle in Ice Age: Dawn of the Dinosaurs and appeared in the fantasy film Night at the Museum: Battle of the Smithsonian as Major General George Armstrong Custer. In April 2009, Hader was a part of Vanity Fair list of "Comedy's New Legends".

Hader took on the voice role of Professor Impossible on the fourth season of The Venture Brothers (2010–2013), a part originated by Stephen Colbert. He voiced the Pod in the Aqua Teen Hunger Force episode "IAMAPOD", as well as Hitler in the episode "Der Inflatable Fuhrer". Hader played Kevin, Matt Damon's copilot, in the live episode of 30 Rock, recorded October 14, 2010. He portrayed "The Voice" in the action-comedy film Scott Pilgrim vs. the World (2010), the disembodied voice that pops up during certain moments of the film's video game-inspired fight scenes. He also had a small cameo as the voice of the USS Vengeance computer in the science fiction film Star Trek Into Darkness (2013).

From 2011 to 2014, Hader hosted Essentials, Jr. on Turner Classic Movies. Hader received the gig after he was a guest programmer with host Robert Osborne who was impressed by Hader's eclectic choices, such as Billy Wilder's 1943 Five Graves to Cairo (1943), Robert Altman's 1970 Brewster McCloud (1970), and Akira Kurosawa's Rashomon (1950). TCM asked him if he would like to host its summer Essentials Jr. showcase that introduces younger audiences to seminal movies from the golden age of Hollywood and international cinema. He was chosen because Hader has a "certain energy and appeal to younger people. He is very passionate about the subject. He isn't just reading a teleprompter. He really cares and knows the movies." During the Essentials, Jr. program, Hader handpicked 13 films (one a week) to screen for the whole family each of those four years. The films he chose included Singin' in the Rain (1952), Bringing Up Baby (1938), The Band Wagon (1953), and The Lavender Hill Mob (1951).

Hader was the guest star in the series premiere of the comedy series The Mindy Project, where he played as Mindy's ex-boyfriend Tom McDougall. His character returned later in the first season. Hader voiced Dr. Malocchio in the Hulu animated comedy series The Awesomes. In 2013, Hader replaced Robert Downey, Jr., as the voice of Mr. Peanut.

Hader decided to leave SNL after eight seasons, informing cast and crew of his decision in February 2013. He came to the conclusion that he needed to leave when his then-wife and he were constantly having to travel to Los Angeles for work, which made it difficult for their children. His final episode was on May 18, 2013. "It was a hard decision, but it has to happen at some point," he told reporters. "It got to a point where I said, 'Maybe it's just time to go.'" On October 11, 2014, Hader returned as host with musical guest Hozier and on March 17, 2018, with musical guest Arcade Fire.

2014–present: Film roles and Barry
Hader starred in a dramatic role in the 2014 film The Skeleton Twins, opposite Kristen Wiig, with whom he worked on Saturday Night Live. The film won for 'Best Screenplay' at the Sundance Film Festival. In 2015, Hader voiced the character of Fear in the Disney-Pixar film Inside Out, and was attached to voice a dinosaur in the Pixar film The Good Dinosaur. However, Hader, alongside John Lithgow, Lucas Neff, Neil Patrick Harris, and Judy Greer, left the project after their characters were redesigned.

In 2015, Hader appeared in Brooklyn Nine-Nine as the captain of the 99th Precinct. Also in 2015, Hader reunited with fellow SNL alumni Fred Armisen and Seth Meyers for the IFC mockumentary series Documentary Now!, wherein he was an actor and a writer.

In December 2015, Drew McWeeny of HitFix reported that the voice of BB-8 was supplied by Hader and Ben Schwartz, both credited as "BB-8 vocal consultants" in the film. The voice was created by Abrams manipulating their voices through a talkbox, attached to an iPad running a sound-effects app. Hader also voiced multiple characters in YouTube channel Bad Lip Reading's parodies of the Star Wars original trilogy. Hader also played a minor supporting role in The Lonely Island's 2016 film Popstar: Never Stop Never Stopping, produced by Judd Apatow.

Hader had his first leading man role in the romantic-comedy opposite Amy Schumer in Trainwreck (2015) and continued in these romantic roles as a former college boyfriend to best friend of Greta Gerwig's title character in Maggie's Plan (2015). Hader voiced Alpha 5 in the 2017 film version of Power Rangers.

In 2018, Hader co-created (with Alec Berg) and began starring in the HBO dark comedy series Barry, for which he received eight Primetime Emmy Award nominations as producer, writer, director, and actor. He won Emmys for Outstanding Lead Actor in a Comedy Series in both 2018 and 2019 and received consecutive nominations for Outstanding Comedy Series, Outstanding Directing for a Comedy Series and Outstanding Writing for a Comedy Series for its first two seasons.

In 2019, Hader starred in the supernatural horror film It: Chapter Two as Richie Tozier (sharing the role with Finn Wolfhard), alongside Jessica Chastain, Bill Skarsgård, Isaiah Mustafa, Jay Ryan, James Ransone, and James McAvoy. Hader received acclaim for his performance. In 2019, he voiced Leonard in The Angry Birds Movie 2, Axel the Carnie in Toy Story 4, The Wanderer in 4 episodes of The Dark Crystal: Age of Resistance, and played Nick Kringle in Noelle.

Influences
Hader has stated that his comedy influences include Monty Python, Alan Alda, Mel Brooks, and Eddie Murphy.

Personal life
Hader has anxiety. During his tenure on Saturday Night Live, he suffered from anxiety and sleep problems. He never felt "truly comfortable" throughout his first four seasons. He was insecure that he had less comedy experience than his peers. He would often not sleep on Fridays before the show and would feel light-headed before broadcasts. He was neurotic regarding his performances; Hader called his early performances "rigid". On one occasion, he began having a panic attack, live on air, while impersonating Julian Assange. It was the final episode of 2010 (hosted by Jeff Bridges), and Hader remembered; "It felt like someone was sitting on my chest. I couldn't breathe, I started sweating. I thought, This is not good — abort! abort!"  Hader is also prone to migraines, and also suffered one live on air; Jason Sudeikis had to guide him on and offstage as he couldn't see anything. Lorne Michaels tried to put him at ease after the incident by remarking to him, "You can work here as long as you want."

Hader is an avid reader who has said that he "didn't really go to college, which is probably why [he] enjoy[s] reading the classics". He named works by Tobias Wolff, Fyodor Dostoevsky, William Faulkner, Richard Ford, George Saunders, and Jun'ichirō Tanizaki among the books on his shelves.

Hader married writer and director Maggie Carey in 2006; they have three daughters together. They announced their separation in November 2017, with Hader filing for divorce that December. The uncontested divorce reached a settlement in March 2018, and was finalized three months later.

In 2019, Hader began dating actress Rachel Bilson, with whom he had co-starred in The To Do List. The couple made their first appearance at the 77th Golden Globe Awards in 2020, and it was reported that they had ended their relationship in July 2020. 

Hader began dating actress Anna Kendrick in late 2020 or early 2021. It was reported on June 28, 2022 that they had ended their relationship.

He has a severe peanut allergy.

Filmography and accolades

References

External links

1978 births
Living people
20th-century American comedians
20th-century American male actors
20th-century American male writers
20th-century American screenwriters
21st-century American comedians
21st-century American male actors
21st-century American male writers
21st-century American screenwriters
American impressionists (entertainers)
American male comedians
American male film actors
American male television actors
American male television writers
American male video game actors
American male voice actors
American people of Danish descent
American people of English descent
American people of German descent
American people of Irish descent
American sketch comedians
American stand-up comedians
American television writers
Comedians from Oklahoma
Male actors from Tulsa, Oklahoma
Outstanding Performance by a Lead Actor in a Comedy Series Primetime Emmy Award winners
Peabody Award winners
Pixar people
Scottsdale Community College alumni
Screenwriters from Oklahoma
Writers from Tulsa, Oklahoma